The discography of Brazilian girl group Rouge consists of four studio albums, one remix album, three DVDs and one cancelled album. The band has also released twelve official singles, two features and three promotional singles. In four years of career, they achieved four Gold, three Platinum and one Diamond album in Brazil and released various hit singles, becoming the most successful Brazilian girl group of all time. As of August 2010, the Rouge have sold approximately 3 million records.

Albums

Studio albums

Extended Play (EP)

Remix albums

Cancelled albums

Singles

Promotional singles

DVDs

Music videos

References

External links
 Rouge website
 Rouge blog

Pop music group discographies
Discographies of Brazilian artists
Discography
Latin music discographies